Netball Federation of India (NFI) is the national governing body of Netball in India. NFI is a non-profit, government funded organisation affiliated with the International Netball Federation (INF), the Asian Federation of Netball Association (AFNA) and the Indian Olympic Association (IOA) and recognised by the Ministry of Youth Affairs and Sports. NFI was established in 1978 to standardise rules and regulations and to promote and develop the growth of netball in India. NFI operates all the Indian national representative netball sides, including the India national netball team and youth sides as well. NFI is also responsible for organising and hosting netball tournaments within India and scheduling the home international fixtures. Vagish Pathak is the current president of the organisation.

History
The game of Netball was introduced in India by evangelist Dr. Harry Crowe Buck of Pennsylvania, United States in 1920 at the YMCA College of Physical Education of Madras (now Chennai). NFI was established in 1978 by Mr. Jagat Singh Lohan(Chauhan) from Rohtak, Haryana who was an alumnus of YMCA College of Physical Education of Madras (now Chennai) and in the same year he organised the first national championships in Jind, Haryana with great contribution of Mrs. Shashi Prabha.
Mr. Jagat Singh Lohan was founder/father of Handball, Netball and Throwball games in India. His efforts in Germany during Munich Olympics (1972) helped in making these a legacy in India.
 
NFI and netball associations of Hong Kong, Malaysia, Singapore and Sri Lanka met during the 1983 Netball World Championships in Singapore to discuss the creation of an Asian netball governing body, which resulted in the establishment of Asian Federation of Netball Associations in 1986 in Kuala Lumpur, Malaysia.

Affiliated Members
NFI affiliates 26 states' governing bodies of Netball in India.

References

India
Sports governing bodies in India
Sports organizations established in 1978
1978 establishments in Delhi
Netball in India
Organisations based in Delhi
Ind